The Greenskeeper is a 2002 horror film starring Allelon Ruggiero.

Plot
Young Allen Anderson (Allelon Ruggiero), a struggling screenwriter is under pressure from his floozy girlfriend Mary Jane (Christi Taylor), due to his mediocre lifestyle and her big dream of earning his huge inheritance (which implies why she is dating him). While celebrating his 25th birthday, Allen is continuously haunted by strange visions of a figure engulfed in flames, a recurring theme in the film. Later in the day, Christi and some of Allen's friends and co-workers coax Allen to keep the family Golf Club open so they can throw a proper birthday party for him.

Clearly unsatisfied, Allen nonetheless invites the rookie employee Elena, whom he actually likes. Meanwhile, a patron is gruesomely murdered and Allen's uncle John (Bruce Taylor) strictly orders the corrupt police officer to keep his trap shut.

That night the party is in full swing with most of the group getting either high on drugs or drinking themselves stupid. When one of the guys is left alone in the pool with his eyes covered, a strange figure in a keeper uniform jumps in and murders him. As the night progresses more people end up dead with the only remaining victims being Elena and Allen.

Elena, after escaping the "Greenskeeper's" cottage in the woods, runs into Allen who knocks the assailant with a shovel. As the Greenskeeper utters Allen's name, John appears and shoots him in the chest. Elena discovers bitemarks on the latter's wrist and it becomes clear who the real murderer is.

It turns out that the real Greenskeeper is actually Allen's father (John Rocker), long thought dead after a mysterious explosion. Instead of killing him, Allen's father was heavily mutilated and hid out in the woods never to face humanity. Knowing this, John concocted the murders of Allen's friends in order to divert attention away from him and that with Allen gone, John would become the next heir to the golf club.

As John is about to shoot Allen, the Greenskeeper intervenes and the two get into a scuffle. During the fight Allen's father is stabbed with a sprinkler hose and John is decapitated with a propeller blade of a lawn mower. With his dying breath, Allen's father apologises to him for the pain he caused and passes away in Elena's arms.

With the terror of the night concluded, Elena and Allen embrace each other and along with Otis, Allen's longtime mentor leave the murder scene as the film ends.

Cast
 Allelon Ruggiero as Allen Anderson
 Bruce Taylor as John Anderson
 Ron Lester as Styles
 Steve Rickman as Chase
 Thomas Merdis as Otis Washington
 John Rocker as The Greenskeeper/George Anderson
 Melissa Ponzio as Elena Rodriguez
 Jamie Renell as Champ
 Allison Kulp as Mary Katherine
 Michael Short as Chet
 Christi Taylor as Mary Jane
 Patrick Donovan as Stu
 Stephanie Bingham as Mary Beth
 John Judy as Officer Cox
 Tim Frasier as Helmet Boy
 Larry Wachs as The Milkman
 Eric Von Haessler as Redneck

Reception

The Greenskeeper received mostly mixed reviews. The DVD & Video Guide by Mick Martin and Marsha Porter called the film "surprisingly entertaining" and Film Threat Magazine said it was a "worthwhile excursion" while British site Popcorn Pictures said it was "wholly unoriginal but has just enough mileage in it to see itself to the end".

References

External links

2002 horror films
2002 films
American slasher films
2000s English-language films
2000s American films